Sophronica amplipennis is a species of beetle in the family Cerambycidae. It was described by Francis Polkinghorne Pascoe in 1888.

Varietas
 Sophronica amplipennis var. rufoampliata Breuning, 1952
 Sophronica amplipennis var. rufulipennis Breuning, 1951

References

Sophronica
Beetles described in 1888